The 1972 Dallas Cowboys season was their 13th in the league. The team failed to improve their previous output of 11–3, winning ten games. They qualified for the playoffs for the seventh consecutive season but settled for the wildcard spot.  A pre-season injury to quarterback Roger Staubach and the trade of Duane Thomas (both had been integral figures in the 1971 championship team) hindered the offense (mitigated somewhat since their replacements, Craig Morton and Calvin Hill, were former starters).  In the divisional playoff round, Staubach came off the bench to engineer an improbable 30–28 comeback win over the 49ers (Dallas had trailed by 28–16 with less than 2 minutes to play).  The win over the 49ers still ranks as one of the all-time great Cowboys wins.  However, the momentum could not carry them to a victory over Washington in the NFC Championship game.

NFL Draft

Regular season
Roger Staubach was lost in the 3rd pre season game with the Los Angeles Rams when Marlin McKeever tackled him. It required him to get a shoulder operation. Veteran backup Quarterback Craig Morton would lead the Cowboys for the 1972 season. When the Cowboys got down in the December 23 playoff game Tom Landry inserted Roger who led them to a come from behind 30–28 victory over San Francisco. In 1972 the Cowboys would build up big leads in games only to hang on to win. Some examples of this would be Monday Night October 30 when they hosted Detroit, the November 5 game in San Diego, a November 12 game at home versus St. Louis, and the December 9 home game against Washington. The December 18, 1972 Sports Illustrated ran a story on the 1972 Dallas Cowboys surrounding their game with the Washington Redskins on pages 20–23, and featuring Cowboy middle linebacker #55 Lee Roy Jordan on the cover.

Still another factor in the Cowboys 1972 season was that All Pro defensive tackle Bob Lilly played through an injury to his back for most all of the year, along with a bone spur near his heel and an injured muscle just above his knee. Lilly was furthermore selected for his 10th Pro Bowl but did not play in the game. Lilly had 2 1/2 sacks on the season, while overall the team totaled 32.

Schedule

Game summaries

Week 1: vs. Philadelphia Eagles

Week 2: at New York Giants

Playoffs

Standings

Season recap
The Dallas Cowboys since its inception have always had cheerleaders, but during the team preparations to defend their World Championship title in 1972, a turning point in cheerleader history would be made with the creation of the Dallas Cowboys Cheerleaders, wearing new star spangled uniforms and performing dance routines, instead of the traditional acrobatic displays.

The Cowboys qualified for the playoffs a record seventh consecutive year.

Roster

Trivia
This season marks the first time in Cowboys history they wore their white jerseys for every game. The second and only other time so far was 2010.

Publications
 The Football Encyclopedia 
 Total Football 
 Cowboys Have Always Been My Heroes

References

External links
 1972 Dallas Cowboys
 Pro Football Hall of Fame
 Dallas Cowboys Official Site

Dallas Cowboys seasons
Dallas Cowboys
Dallas Cowboys